Events from the year 1865 in art.

Events
 July 21 – Charles Dodgson (Lewis Carroll) photographs Effie Gray Millais, John Everett Millais, and their daughters Effie and Mary at 7 Cromwell Place, London.
 Ford Madox Brown completes his painting Work after thirteen years.
 Morris, Marshall, Faulkner & Co. install the stained-glass east window in the chapel of St Edmund Hall, Oxford, England, designed by Edward Burne-Jones, William Morris and Philip Webb.
 Édouard Manet's painting Olympia is first exhibited, at the Salon (Paris), and causes controversy.
 Jean-François Millet's painting The Angelus (L'Angélus) is first exhibited and becomes very popular in France.
 The Bargello in Florence becomes an art museum.

Works

 Lawrence Alma-Tadema – An Egyptian at his Doorway
 Albert Bierstadt
 Looking Down Yosemite Valley, California
 Staubbach Falls, near Lauterbrunnen, Switzerland
 Ford Madox Brown – Work
 Constantino Brumidi – The Apotheosis of Washington (fresco in United States Capitol rotunda)
 Augustus Burke – Connemara Girl
 Edward Burne-Jones and William Morris – The Crucifixion (stained-glass window for chapel of St Edmund Hall, Oxford)
 Frederic Edwin Church – Aurora Borealis
 Jean-Baptiste-Camille Corot – Ville d'Avray
 Gustave Courbet
 Portrait of Countess Karoly
 Le ruisseau noir
 Honoré Daumier – The Third-Class Carriage (National Gallery of Canada, Ottawa)
 Edgar Degas – Medieval War Scene, his first painting exhibited at the Salon (Paris)
 Thomas Faed – The Last of the Clan
 William Powell Frith – Mary Elizabeth Maxwell (née Braddon)
 Jean-Léon Gérôme – Prayer
 Henri Harpignies – Les Corbeaux
 Henry Holiday – Stained glass windows for chapel of Worcester College, Oxford
 Winslow Homer – The Veteran in a New Field
 Elisabeth Jerichau-Baumann – A Wounded Danish Soldier
 Sir Edwin Henry Landseer – Lady Godiva's Prayer (approximate date)
 Andrew and George Anderson Lawson – Wellington's Column, Liverpool
 Benjamin Williams Leader – Autumn's Last Gleam
 Edward Lear – Jerusalem (Ashmolean Museum, Oxford)
 Thomas Le Clear – Interior with Portraits

 Édouard Manet
 Angélina (Musée d'Orsay, Paris)
 Bull-Fighting Scene (Private collection)
 The Mocking of Christ (Art Institute of Chicago)
 The Tragic Actor (Rouvière as Hamlet) (National Gallery of Art, Washington, D.C.)
 George Hemming Mason – The Cast Shoe
 Adolph Menzel – The Coronation of King William I in Königsberg 1861
 John Everett Millais
 Esther
 Waking
 Aimé Millet – Vercingétorix monument
 Henry Moore – The Rainbow
 Gustave Moreau – Thracian Girl Carrying the Head of Orpheus on His Lyre
 Edward Poynter – Faithful unto Death
 Val Prinsep – The Lady of the Tooti-Nameh or The legend of the parrot
 Illarion Pryanishnikov – Jokers: Gostiny Dvor in Moscow
 Dante Gabriel Rossetti – The Blue Bower
 Alfred Sisley – Avenue of Chestnut Trees near La Celle-Saint-Cloud
 John Tenniel – illustrations to Alice's Adventures in Wonderland 
 S. S. Teulon – Buxton Memorial Fountain (Westminster)
 James McNeill Whistler – Rose and Silver: The Princess from the Land of Porcelain
 Franz Xaver Winterhalter – Emperor Franz Joseph
 Thomas Woolner – Godley Statue

Births
 January 19 – Valentin Serov, Russian portrait painter (died 1911)
 January 23 – Connie Gilchrist, English child actress and model (died 1946)
 April 26 – Akseli Gallen-Kallela, Finnish painter (died 1931)
 May 5 – Albert Aurier, French poet, art critic and painter, devoted to Symbolism (died 1892)
 June 25 – Robert Henri, American painter, leader of the Ash Can School (died 1929)
 June 26 – Bernard Berenson, Lithuanian-born American art historian (died 1959)
 June 28 – David Young Cameron, Scottish painter (died 1945)
 August 2 – John Radecki, Polish-born Australian stained glass artist (died 1955)
 August 20 – Frank DuMond, American painter, illustrator and teacher (died 1951)
 September 23 – Suzanne Valadon, French artists' model and painter (died 1938)
 November 11 – Donatus Buongiorno, Italian-born American painter (died 1935)
 December 28 – Félix Vallotton, Swiss painter and graphic artist (died 1925)
 date unknown – Adelaïde Alsop Robineau, American painter and potter (died 1929)

Deaths
 January 10 – William Fox-Strangways, 4th Earl of Ilchester, English diplomat and art collector (born 1795)
 January 12 – Kunisada, Japanese designer of ukiyo-e woodblock prints (born 1786)
 January 19 – Clementina Maude, Viscountess Hawarden, British portrait photographer (born 1822)
 January 21 – Johan Erik Lindh, Swedish painter and former decorative painter who moved to Finland (born 1793)
 January 23 – Joseph-Désiré Court, French painter of historical subjects and portraits (born 1797)
 February 21 – Constant Troyon, French painter (born 1810)
 April 21 – Josef Matěj Navrátil, Czech painter of murals and frescoes (born 1798)
 April 28 – Robert William Sievier, English engraver, sculptor and inventor (born 1794)
 June 18 – Antoine Wiertz, Belgian painter (born 1806)
 July 11 – Ammi Phillips, American folk portrait painter (born 1788)
 August 14 – Fitz Henry Lane, American Luminist marine painter (born 1804)
 August 23 – Ferdinand Georg Waldmüller, Austrian painter and writer (born 1793)
 September 17 – John Neagle, American portrait painter (born 1796)
 September 23 – John Frederick Herring, Sr., English painter, signmaker and coachman in Victorian England (born 1795)
 September 29 – François Joseph Heim, French painter (born 1787)
 November 1 – Charles-François Lebœuf, French sculptor (born 1792)
 December 24 – Charles Lock Eastlake, English painter and art collector (born 1793)
 date unknown
 Tivadar Alconiere, Hungarian painter (born 1797)
 Michael Hanhart, English lithographer and chromolithographer (born 1788)

References

 
Years of the 19th century in art
1860s in art